The Ministry of Industry, Trade and Technology is a former government department in the province of Manitoba, Canada. It was created in 1983 by the New Democratic Party government of Howard Pawley, drawing in responsibilities from other ministries.

The department was merged with the Ministry of Business Development and Tourism to create the Ministry of Industry, Trade and Tourism in 1988.

List of Ministers of Industry, Trade and Technology

Industry,_Trade_and_Technology